Acerotella is a genus of parasitoid wasps belonging to the family Platygastridae.

The genus was described in 1964 by Masner.

The genus has cosmopolitan distribution.

Species:
 Acerotella boter (Walker, 1838).
 Acerotella hungarica (Szelényi, 1938)

References

Platygastridae